Tai Xiaohu (born 1 March 1998 in Gaomi) is a male Chinese diver specializing in 10 metre synchronized event. He four times  won the champions at FINA Diving World Series, twice the goldlists for men's 10 metre platform synchro events in 2014 and 2015, twice the first for men's 10 metre platform synchro mixed events in 2015 and 2016.

References

Living people
1998 births
People from Weifang
Sportspeople from Shandong
Chinese male divers
World Aquatics Championships medalists in diving
20th-century Chinese people
21st-century Chinese people